In four-dimensional Euclidean geometry, the bitruncated 16-cell honeycomb (or runcicantic tesseractic honeycomb) is a uniform space-filling tessellation (or honeycomb) in Euclidean 4-space.

Symmetry constructions 
There are 3 different symmetry constructions, all with 3-3 duopyramid vertex figures.

See also 
Regular and uniform honeycombs in 4-space:
Tesseractic honeycomb
 16-cell honeycomb
24-cell honeycomb
Rectified 24-cell honeycomb
Truncated 24-cell honeycomb
Snub 24-cell honeycomb
5-cell honeycomb
Truncated 5-cell honeycomb
Omnitruncated 5-cell honeycomb

Notes

References 
 Kaleidoscopes: Selected Writings of H. S. M. Coxeter, edited by F. Arthur Sherk, Peter McMullen, Anthony C. Thompson, Asia Ivic Weiss, Wiley-Interscience Publication, 1995,  
 (Paper 24) H.S.M. Coxeter, Regular and Semi-Regular Polytopes III, [Math. Zeit. 200 (1988) 3-45]
 George Olshevsky, Uniform Panoploid Tetracombs, Manuscript (2006) (Complete list of 11 convex uniform tilings, 28 convex uniform honeycombs, and 143 convex uniform tetracombs)
  x3x3x *b3x *b3o, x3x3o *b3x4o, o3x3x4o3o - bithit - O107

Honeycombs (geometry)
5-polytopes
Bitruncated tilings